Taling Chan is a tambon (sub-district) of Mueang Saraburi District, Saraburi Province, central Thailand.

History
The area previously known as "Ban Nong Bua" (บ้านหนองบัว, "lotus pond village"). The name Taling Chan is a name given by the King Rama V, when he visited the people along the connected rivers. Locals built the pavilion for the king on a boulder. Hence, the name "Taling Chan" (steep bank) according to the terrain.

Geography
Most of the subdistrict consists of lowlands along the Pasak River, therefore suitable for agriculture.

Neighbouring areas consists of (from north clockwise): Ban Kaeng in Chaloem Phra Kiat, Tan Diao in Kaeng Khoi, Kut Nok Plao and Takut in its district.

Taling Chan has a total area of 26.516 square kilometers (16,572.50 rais).

Administration
The area is administered by the Subdistrict Administrative Organization (SAO) Taling Chan (องค์การบริหารส่วนตำบลตลิ่งชัน).

Taling Chan also consists of eight administrative villages (muban)

Demography
Total population of 4,590 people (2,288 men, and 2,302 women) in 1,840 households.

Economy
Most Taling Chan residents work in employees, minority are agriculturists and traders.

Transportation
Taling Chan is served by the Nong Bua Railway Station of the State Railway of Thailand (SRT), whose Northeastern Railway runs  pass the area.

Places
Wat Taling Chan Temple
Saraburi Provincial Transport Office
Robinson Lifestyle Saraburi
Makro Saraburi

References

Tambon of Saraburi Province